The simple station Virrey is part of the TransMilenio mass-transit system of Bogotá, Colombia, which opened in the year 2000.

Location

The station is located in northern Bogotá, specifically on Autopista Norte with Calle 90.

It serves the Chicó and Polo Club neighborhoods, as well as the commercial areas on Calle 90 and part of the Zona Rosa area. It's the closest one to the "Parque de la 93"

History

After the opening of the Portal de Usme in early 2001, the Autopista Norte line was opened. This station was added as a northerly expansion of that line, which was completed with the opening of the Portal del Norte later that year.

The station is named Virrey due to its proximity to Parque El Virrey, a greenway and bike path that follow Calle 88 from Avenida 7a to Autopista Norte.

Station Services

Old trunk services

Main line service

Feeder routes

This station does not have connections to feeder routes.

Inter-city service

This station does not have inter-city service.

External links
TransMilenio

See also
Bogotá
TransMilenio
List of TransMilenio Stations

TransMilenio